Le Crapouillot was a French magazine started by Jean Galtier-Boissière as a satiric publication in France, during World War I. In the trenches during World War I, the affectionate term for le petit crapaud, "the little toad" was used by French soldiers, the poilus, to designate small trench-mortars.

Muckraking and satirical period
The first issue of Le Crapouillot was published in August 1915, carrying the subtitle "Courage les civils!"  ("Take heart, civilians!"). It was distributed at first, by Boissière, to his fellow soldiers. It was "insolent", "non-conformist" and carried the spirit of "both the avant-garde of the belle époque and libertarian politics". It was also a muckraking publication, focusing on sensitive subjects of its such as the origins and causes of the Great War; French soldiers' mutinies; wartime homosexuality and prostitution in the Army; Entente propaganda; etc.

In 1925, the magazine became a monthly. From 1961 to 1964 it was published four issues per year. Until its close in 1990 the frequency of the magazine was irregular.

Political period
After France was liberated from the German occupation in 1944, the magazine took a stand against the purges conducted against collaborators among the nationalist intelligentsia, such as the trial and execution of Robert Brasillach. Throughout the Fourth and early French Fifth Republics, and until its creator's death in 1966, the publication gradually became a forum for articles, reports and editorials written by French nationalists, including ex-Vichy collaborators, Holocaust deniers, right-wing anarchists, and neo-fascists, culminating in its final years, into a magazine strictly of the Extreme Right.

The nationalist journalist Roland Gaucher was its owner and chief editor between from 1991 to 1994. The publication of Le Crapouillot continued until 1996.

See also
Je suis partout magazine

Notes

Further reading
 Michael Barnes, 'Le Crapouillot', in Parenthesis; 17 (2009 Autumn), p. 29.

References
 Kaplan, Alice Yaeger: The collaborator: The trial & execution of Robert Brasillach, University Of Chicago Press; 2001,

External links
 Crapouillot online in Gallica, the digital library of the BnF.
 Le Crapouillot; Paris ; library search
 Website about Le Crapouillot

1996 disestablishments in France
Defunct magazines published in France
French-language magazines
Irregularly published magazines
Magazines established in 1915
Magazines disestablished in 1996
Magazines published in Paris
Monthly magazines published in France
Satirical magazines published in France